Tonka of the Gallows (Czech: Tonka Šibenice, French: Tonischka, German: Die Galgentoni) is a 1930 Czech drama film directed by Karl Anton and starring Ita Rina, Vera Baranovskaya and Josef Rovenský.

It is an adaptation of the novella Die Himmelfahrt der Galgentoni by Egon Erwin Kisch.

The movie was shot as a silent movie, but later Czech, German and French post-synchronized sound versions were made.

Plot
The movie follows story of a country girl Tonka who lives in Prague and works as a prostitute unbeknownst to her family. One day a convicted murderer Prokůpek requests to spend a night with a girl before his execution. Policemen ask many prostitutes if they're willing to do this job, but all of them refuse except Tonka. As a result, none of her customers wants to visit her again and other prostitutes shun her.

Cast
Ita Rina as Tonka of the Gallows
Vera Baranovskaya Tonka's mother
Josef Rovenský as Murderer Prokůpek
Jack Mylong-Münz as Jan
Jindřich Plachta as Cabman
Antonie Nedošinská as Whorehouse owner
Emilie Nitschová as Chestnut seller
Rudolf Štěpán as Executioner
Felix Kühne as Salesman
Theodor Pištěk as Drunkard
Jan Sviták as Pimp
Karel Jelínek as Whorehouse customer

Production 
Writer Egon Erwin Kisch allegedly met a prostitute Antonie Havlová who told him her life story shortly before her death in 1911. He wrote a novella Die Himmelfahrt der Galgentoni based on her life in 1921. In the same year a theatre play based on the book was produced at Revoluční scéna with Xena Longenová playing the main role. Karel Anton decided to make a silent movie based on the book. The shooting started in autumn 1929 at Kavalírka studio in Košíře. Unfortunatelly the stages burned down on 25 October together with some reels of the film. The movie was finished at AB studios in Vinohrady and it was decided to release the movie as a sound film. Czech, French and German post-synchrons were recorded at Gaumont Joinville studio in Paris.

Reception 
Tonka of the Gallows premiered at Alfa cinema in Prague on 27 February 1930. The movie was advertised as the "first Czech sound film". Contemporary critics mostly praised the movie with Filmový přehled writing "The impression with which I left the theatre was unforgettable and rivetting." In France Hebdo-Film wrote "Karl Anton has used all the means of expression offered by modern cinematographic techniques, but his personality has always allowed him to avoid the traps set by convention and sentimentality."

Restoration 
Only the French version survived to this day. From the Czech version only the beginning with Karel Hašler singing Hradčany krásné survived. The French version was digitally restored and released on DVD in 2016 by Národní filmový archiv. It was screened at MoMA in 2017 and San Francisco Silent Film Festival and Phoenix Cinema, London in 2019.

References

Bibliography 
 Brož, Jaroslav & Frída, Myrtil. Historie československého filmu v obrazech 1930 – 1945, Orbis, Prague, 1966.

External links 
 
 
 

1930 films
Czech drama films
1930 drama films
1930s Czech-language films
1930s German-language films
1930s French-language films
Films directed by Karl Anton
Czech black-and-white films
Transitional sound drama films
1930 multilingual films
Czech multilingual films
Czechoslovak multilingual films
French-language Czech films
German-language Czech films